Iron Man: The Best of Black Sabbath is a compilation album from Black Sabbath, released by Sanctuary Records to support the band's 2012 reunion tour.

The album features exactly the same track listing as 2009's Greatest Hits.

Track listing

Personnel
Black Sabbath
Ozzy Osbourne - vocals
Tony Iommi - guitar
Geezer Butler - bass
Bill Ward - drums

Certifications

References 

2012 greatest hits albums
Black Sabbath compilation albums
Sanctuary Records compilation albums
Albums produced by Patrick Meehan (producer)